Rafael Guijosa Castillo (born 31 January 1969, in Alcalá de Henares) is a former Spanish handball player, and current manager of Iran men's national handball team. When playing for the Spanish national team, he won bronze medals both in the 1996 Summer Olympics in Atlanta and in the 2000 Summer Olympics in Sydney.

Guijosa was voted World Player of the Year 1999 by the International Handball Federation.

References
sports-reference

External links

1969 births
Living people
Spanish male handball players
Olympic handball players of Spain
Handball players at the 1996 Summer Olympics
Handball players at the 2000 Summer Olympics
Olympic bronze medalists for Spain
People from Alcalá de Henares
Liga ASOBAL players
FC Barcelona Handbol players
Olympic medalists in handball
Medalists at the 2000 Summer Olympics
Medalists at the 1996 Summer Olympics
Handball players from the Community of Madrid
20th-century Spanish people